The World Diamond Congress is a bi-annual industry event organized by World Federation of Diamond Bourses and the International Diamond Manufacturers Association. The first World Diamond Congress was held in Antwerpen, Belgium in 1947. It was held annually till 1956 and since then - every two years. Every year in between the World Federation of Diamond Bourses and the International Diamond Manufacturers Association hold their Presidents' Meeting. Last 36th Congress was held in 2014 in Antwerpen, Belgium. Next, 37th Congress will take place in Dubai in May 2016.

Previous Congresses:

1947         1st World Diamond Congress         Antwerp, Belgium
1948         2nd World Diamond Congress        Antwerp, Belgium
1949         3rd World Diamond Congress         London, United Kingdom
1950         4th World Diamond Congress         Amsterdam, Netherlands
1951         5th World Diamond Congress         Antwerp, Belgium
1953         6th World Diamond Congress         London, United Kingdom
1954         7th World Diamond Congress         Antwerp, Belgium
1955         8th World Diamond Congress         Paris, France
1956         9th World Diamond Congress         Tel Aviv, Israel
1958         10th World Diamond Congress       Antwerp, Belgium
1960         11th World Diamond Congress       Johannesburg, South Africa
1962         12th World Diamond Congress       Vienna, Austria
1964         13th World Diamond Congress       New York, USA
1966         14th World Diamond Congress       Milan, Italy
1968         15th World Diamond Congress       Tel Aviv, Israel
1970         16th World Diamond Congress       Johannesburg, South Africa
1972         17th World Diamond Congress       Antwerp, Belgium
1975         18th World Diamond Congress       Amsterdam, Netherlands
1978         19th World Diamond Congress       Ramat Gan, Israel
1980         20th World Diamond Congress       Johannesburg, South Africa
1982         21st World Diamond Congress       New York, USA
1984         22nd World Diamond Congress      Antwerp, Belgium
1986         23rd World Diamond Congress       Tel Aviv, Israel
1988         24th World Diamond Congress       Singapore
1991         25th World Diamond Congress       London, United Kingdom
1993         26th World Diamond Congress       Antwerp, Belgium
1996         27th World Diamond Congress       Tel Aviv, Israel
1998         28th World Diamond Congress       Bangkok, Thailand
2000         29th World Diamond  Congress      Antwerp, Belgium
2002         30th World Diamond Congress       London, United Kingdom
2004         31st World Diamond Congress       New York, USA
2006         32nd World Diamond Congress      Tel Aviv, Israel
2008         33rd World Diamond Congress      Shanghai, China
2010         34th World Diamond Congress      Moscow, Russia
2012         35th World Diamond Congress      Mumbai, India
2014         36th World Diamond  Congress      Antwerp, Belgium
2016         37th World Diamond  Congress      Dubai, United Arab Emirates

See also
 Diamonds as an investment
 List of diamonds

References

Diamond industry
Biennial events
Trade fairs
Recurring events established in 1947